Jókai bean soup is a Hungarian bean soup.

Ingredients
Ingredients may include:
 100g dry pinto beans
 100g purified root 
 100g purified carrot 
 100g purified celery 
 100g onion 
 100g fat 
 100g flour 
 500g of Debrecen sausage
 500g of pork 
 2 cloves of garlic
 1 bay leaf 
 1 packet of parsley 
 6 dl sour cream 
 2 liters of bone broth or juice (no juice or bone broth, prepared with water too) 
 salt 
 Paprika
 Vinegar

Preparation
The beans are well washed and soaked overnight before cooking. 
The well water must exit the beans. 
The next day, start to cook the Debrecen sausage with the pork knuckle in the bone juice or broth (water). Add the bay leaf. Remove the sausage from the broth after 10 minutes and set aside. When the beans begin to soften, add the diced vegetables and 2 cloves of garlic, which is a slightly cut. Simmer. If the knuckle is soft, remove from the soup. We prepare the Hungarian roux (fat, flour, finely chopped red onion, red pepper), with this fried preparation, we condense the soup. Add sour cream to the soup with a little sour cream were collected and then add to the soup. Slight flavour the soup with vinegar. In the bone cooked pork, cut into small cubes, cut into slices and add to the soup in the boiling water.

Origin

The soup was named from Jókai Mór, a Hungarian writer. Jókai was a regular guest at a restaurant on Balatonfüred, where he almost always ordered bean soup, so in honor of the food Jókai bean soup named after him.

In Jókai's works, there are some serious gastronomical historical writings, compilations, communications resources can be found. Multiple sources also know that he liked the pepperoni "halászosleves". For some reason he didn't want to write or say chowder! In imitation sound ambiguous - he said.

She liked the pig nails cooked in beans, which is so-called Greek reader with angel boots.
The writings of historical interest located throughout the volumes of gastronomy . In 1854 he published the "Zoltán Kárpáthy" we find the buffet in the description.

There's almost no reference to an old Coffee gathering, tea, carnival cheering, or other curiosity that the reader can miss in his writings. Describes as the New Year krampampuli authentic preparation.

Where he was and specialties offered him, he noted. Forthcoming in his works there's some form of proof that contained, even if somebody just told him about the food.

See also

 List of bean soups
 List of soups

References

Hungarian cuisine
Bean soups
Legume dishes